Ryan Scott Hoag (born November 23, 1979) is an American former football wide receiver. He was drafted by the Oakland Raiders with the final pick in the 2003 NFL Draft, earning him the title of Mr. Irrelevant. He never played in a regular season game. He played college football at Gustavus Adolphus.

Hoag has also been a member of the New York Giants, Minnesota Vikings, Washington Redskins, Edmonton Eskimos, Jacksonville Jaguars and New York Sentinels.  Hoag currently works as a teaching artist for Upstream Arts as well as the head varsity tennis coach at his alma mater, Washburn High School in Minneapolis, Minnesota. He is also the head tennis pro at The Lafayette Club and assistant tennis pro at Lost Creek Country Club.

Early years
Hoag was born in Minneapolis, Minnesota, and attended Washburn High School. Hoag lettered in football, basketball, soccer, and tennis and was twice named all-conference and team captain in tennis, as well as an all-conference honoree in soccer.

College career
He began his college career as a walk-on soccer player at Wake Forest University.

He attended Division III Gustavus Adolphus College in St. Peter, Minnesota. He left Gustavus with 144 receptions for 2,232 yards (15.5 average) and 29 touchdowns. He was the only Gustavus player with over 2,000 career receiving yards and was an All-MIAC 1st-team selection as a junior and senior as well as being named Gustavus Male Athlete of the Year as a senior. He caught 56 passes for 808 yards (14.4 avg.) and ten touchdowns as a senior, and also returned 13 kickoffs for 397 yards (30.5 avg.). He set a school record with 13 catches for 175 yards, and achieving 313 total yards (175 receiving, 122 kickoff return, four punt return and 12 rushing). As a junior, Hoag pulled in 54 passes for 876 yards (16.2 avg.) and set a Gustavus record with 14 touchdowns. He also caught 34 passes for 548 yards (16.1 avg.) and five touchdowns as a sophomore.

He took 3rd at 2002 NCAA Division III Outdoor Track and Field Championships in the 100-meter dash with a time of 10.51 and 4th at the 2003 Indoor Championships in the 55-meter dash at 6.45.

Professional career

New York Giants
Hoag signed to the New York Giants' practice squad on November 19, 2003 and was released by New York on May 20, 2004.

Minnesota Vikings
Hoag was signed by the Minnesota Vikings on June 24, 2004 and spent three weeks of the 2004 season on the active roster in Minnesota, but was not activated for any of those three games. He spent the other 14 weeks on the practice squad before being released on September 3, 2005. He signed a third time on April 5, 2006 and was finally released by Minnesota on September 2, 2006.

Washington Redskins
Hoag was signed by Washington to the practice squad on November 22, 2006 and released by Washington on November 28, 2006. Hoag re-signed to the Redskins' practice squad on December 27, 2006 and was commissioned to the Berlin Thunder of the now defunct NFL Europa league where his playing opportunities were scarce.

In 2007, Hoag spent training camp with the Redskins. He was rumored to be a contender for the final 53-man roster, but was released on September 1 as part of the team's final roster cuts.

Edmonton Eskimos
On September 11, 2007, Hoag signed a practice roster agreement with the Edmonton Eskimos of Canadian Football League. On October 3, 2007, he was released from their practice squad.

Jacksonville Jaguars
On July 25, 2008, Hoag was signed by the Jacksonville Jaguars. In two preseason games, Hoag caught five passes for 98 yards, including a 53-yard reception in Jacksonville's preseason opener against the Miami Dolphins. He was released by the Jaguars on August 30, 2008, when the team made their final cuts.

New York Sentinels
Hoag was drafted by the New York Sentinels of the United Football League in the UFL Premiere Season Draft. He signed with the team on August 5, 2009.

The Bachelorette
Hoag was a contestant on season four the ABC reality television dating show The Bachelorette, which premiered May 19, 2008. On the debut episode, he said he was a virgin, explaining, "Christianity is first and foremost in my life. [...] I don't have sex. I'm not going to do that until I'm married. So I have wondered about DeAnna in terms of how she'll deal with the fact that I'm a virgin. I don't know how she'll deal with the fact that I hold faith as the number one thing in my life." On the May 26, 2008 episode, Hoag was eliminated when he did not receive a rose. He also participated in the third season of The Bachelor Pad, which began on July 23, 2012 and he was voted off the following week on July 30, 2012.

References

External links
Just Sports Stats
Jacksonville Jaguars bio 

1979 births
Living people
Players of American football from Minneapolis
American football wide receivers
Wake Forest Demon Deacons football players
Gustavus Adolphus Golden Gusties football players
Oakland Raiders players
New York Giants players
Minnesota Vikings players
Washington Redskins players
Edmonton Elks players
Jacksonville Jaguars players
New York Sentinels players
Omaha Nighthawks players
Bachelor Nation contestants
Players of Canadian football from Minnesota